The Sherborne Mercury is a defunct regional newspaper, published in Sherborne, Dorset, United Kingdom. It began publication in 1737, predating the national Times.

It was a hugely influential newspaper, particularly as its news coverage and distribution went well beyond that of the boundaries of Dorset.

Before any newspaper was published in Cornwall, the Sherborne Mercury had many subscribers and distribution throughout Cornwall, as far west as Penzance, It covered many Cornish news items, and was read by key businessmen and members of the professional class in the County. Archive copies are available in the Cornish Studies Centre in Redruth.

It was published by Robert Goadby (1720/21–1778), a printer and bookseller.

It commenced publishing in 1737, and it eventually became the Sherborne & Yeovil Mercury. It was sometimes known as the Western Flying Post.

Robert Goadby died in Oborne, Dorset, where his body is buried in the local churchyard.

Selected content from the newspaper

Goadby later inserted the following in his newspaper:

"This is to inform all....in the counties of Wilts, Dorset, Somerset, Devonshire and Cornwall, that the proprietor is ever willing to oblige every single person; but that it is impossible to contrive the circuit of the news carriers, as to take in every house or place; but if the inhabitants of any such parishes were this paper is not at present carried, would be so kind as to send a messenger to any place where it is brought in its usual circuit, for as many papers as are wanted in the parish, the proprietor will allow the person who comes for them a halfpenny on each paper he takes, besides a further allowance upon all the pamphlets, book &c. which he can sell in the said parishes."

Sherbornes
The hawkers, news boys and news carriers were known as Sherbornes. This name was also applied to hawkers and carriers of other regional and local newspapers in the West Country.

Articles of record

Archive copies of this local paper can be found in the County Archives offices of: Wiltshire, Dorset, Devon and Cornwall, testament to its historical importance as a newspaper of record in the West Country. It remains a popular source for genealogists and local historians.

References

Newspapers published in Dorset
Defunct newspapers published in the United Kingdom
Organisations based in Dorset
Publications established in 1737
1737 establishments in England
Sherborne